Francis Robin Houssemayne Du Boulay, FBA (19 December 1920 – 2 January 2008) was a distinguished medieval historian and Fellow of the British Academy.

Education
Known as Robin Du Boulay, he was born at Chislehurst on 19 December 1920.  He lived in Alexandria, Egypt, until he was 8 years old, where his father worked.  He then gained a place at Christ's Hospital, and was subsequently awarded an exhibition to read history at Balliol College, Oxford.

Du Boulay's undergraduate studies were interrupted by the Second World War, and he was commissioned in the Royal Artillery in 1943, but he returned to Balliol in 1945 and graduated with First Class honours in history in 1947.

Career
Upon graduation, Du Boulay joined the faculty of the history department of Bedford College, University of London.

Du Boulay was Professor of Medieval History at the University of London from 1960 to 1982, and was elected a Fellow of the British Academy in 1980.

Select publications
 The Lordship of Canterbury (1966)
 An Age of Ambition (1970)
 Germany in the Later Middle Ages (1983)
 The England of Piers Plowman (1991)
 Servants of Empire (2011 – published posthumously)

References

1920 births
2008 deaths
20th-century English historians
Robin
British medievalists
Historians of England
Historians of Germany
Historians of the British Empire
People from Chislehurst
Alumni of Balliol College, Oxford
People educated at Christ's Hospital
Fellows of the British Academy
Academics of Bedford College, London
British Army personnel of World War II
Royal Artillery officers
British expatriates in Egypt
Converts to Roman Catholicism from Anglicanism
Fellows of the Royal Historical Society